Barack Obama assumed office as President of the United States on January 20, 2009, and his term ended on January 20, 2017. The president has the authority to nominate members of his Cabinet to the United States Senate for confirmation under the Appointments Clause of the United States Constitution.

Before confirmation and during congressional hearings a high-level career member of an executive department heads this pre-confirmed cabinet on an acting basis. The Cabinet's creation was part of the transition of power following the 2008 presidential election.

This page documents the nomination and confirmation process for cabinet nominees of Obama's administration. They are listed in order of creation of the cabinet position (also used as the basis for the presidential line of succession).

Cabinet

Cabinet officials on January 20, 2017

Confirmation process

Confirmation votes

For comparison, 

¶ Confirmations before June 2009
The below is a list of confirmations that were approved through the Senate from January to May 2009, by a recorded roll-call vote, rather than by a voice vote.

¶ Confirmations after June 2009 (August 6, 2009 – December 8, 2011)

Elected officials

President
On November 4, 2008, it was announced that Democrat Barack Obama defeated Senator John McCain, in the 2008 presidential election. Barack Obama received 365 electoral votes compared to McCain's 173 electoral votes, with 270 needed to win the presidency. He assumed office on January 20, 2009.

Vice President

The vice president is an elected official rather than an appointed position, and therefore does not require confirmation by the Senate.

Since shortly following Biden's withdrawal from the presidential race, Obama had been privately telling Biden that he was interested in finding an important place for him in a possible Obama administration.  In a June 22, 2008, interview on NBC's Meet the Press, Biden confirmed that, although he was not actively seeking a spot on the ticket, he would accept the vice presidential nomination if offered. In early August, Obama and Biden met in secret to discuss a possible vice-presidential relationship.  On August 22, 2008, Barack Obama announced that Biden would be his running mate. The New York Times reported that the strategy behind the choice reflected a desire to fill out the ticket with someone who has foreign policy and national security experience—and not to help the ticket win a swing state or to emphasize Obama's "change" message.  Other observers pointed out Biden's appeal to middle-class and blue-collar voters, as well as his willingness to aggressively challenge Republican nominee John McCain in a way that Obama seemed uncomfortable doing at times.  In accepting Obama's offer, Biden ruled out to him the possibility of running for president again in 2016.

On November 4, 2008, Obama was elected president and Biden vice president of the United States.  The Obama-Biden ticket won 365 electoral college votes to McCain-Palin's 173, and had a 53–46 percent edge in the nationwide popular vote.
Biden became the 47th Vice President of the United States on January 20, 2009, when he was inaugurated alongside President Barack Obama. He succeeded Dick Cheney. Biden is the first United States Vice President from Delaware and the first Roman Catholic to attain that office. Biden's oath of office was administered by Supreme Court Justice John Paul Stevens.
As the presidential transition of Barack Obama began, Biden said he was in daily meetings with Obama and that McCain was still his friend.  The U.S. Secret Service codename given to Biden is "Celtic", referencing his Irish roots.

Biden chose veteran Democratic lawyer and aide Ron Klain to be his vice-presidential chief of staff, and Time Washington bureau chief Jay Carney to be his director of communications.  Biden intended to eliminate some of the explicit roles assumed by the vice presidency of Cheney.  But otherwise, Biden said he would not model his vice presidency on any of the ones before him, but instead would seek to provide advice and counsel on every critical decision Obama would make.  Biden said he had been closely involved in all the cabinet appointments that were made during the transition.  Biden was also named to head the new White House Task Force on Working Families, an initiative aimed at improving the economic well-being of the middle class.

Nominated candidates for Cabinet positions
The following cabinet positions are listed in order of their creation (also used as the basis for the United States presidential line of succession).

Secretary of State
The Secretary of State designate is reviewed and presented to the full Senate by the Senate Foreign Relations Committee.

Hillary Clinton (2009–2013)

Hillary Clinton assumed the office of Secretary of State on January 21, 2009. In mid-November 2008, President-elect Obama and Clinton discussed the possibility of her serving as U.S. Secretary of State in his administration, along with rumored nominees such as Bill Richardson, John Kerry, Sam Nunn and Chuck Hagel and on November 21, reports indicated that she had accepted the position. Clinton was floated in emails by Obama transition officials as a possible secretary of health and human services. On December 1, President-elect Obama formally announced that Clinton would be his nominee for Secretary of State. Clinton said she was reluctant to leave the Senate, but that the new position represented a "difficult and exciting adventure". The appointment required a Saxbe fix, as Clinton was then a member of the United States Senate. As part of the nomination, Clinton's husband, former president Bill Clinton, agreed to accept a number of conditions and restrictions regarding his ongoing activities and fundraising efforts for the Clinton Presidential Center and Clinton Global Initiative.

Confirmation hearings before the Senate Foreign Relations Committee began on January 13, 2009, a week before the Obama inauguration; two days later, the committee voted 16–1 to approve Clinton.  By this time, Clinton's public approval rating had reached 65 percent, the highest point since the Lewinsky scandal. On January 21, 2009, Clinton was confirmed in the full Senate by a roll call vote of 94–2. Clinton took the oath of office of Secretary of State and resigned from the Senate the same day.

Senate Foreign Relations Committee Chairman John Kerry stated that he expected Clinton to face some tough questions, but thought she was going to do a good job at (being Secretary of State). Christopher Hitchens of Vanity Fair called her nomination a ludicrous embarrassment on the edition of November 18, 2008, of Hardball due to the Clintons' overseas connections, her actions during the 2008 Democratic Presidential Primary. Senator John Cornyn (R-Texas) voted against a unanimous voice approval, citing ethical concerns. He sought not to block the nomination through a filibuster, but to voice his opposition to her policies. Senator David Vitter (R-Louisiana) also voted against Clinton in Committee citing her husband's foreign donations for his non-profit entities.

John Kerry (2013–2017)

Hillary Clinton had announced she would not stay on in a second Obama term. Obama nominated Senator John Kerry of Massachusetts as his Secretary of State. On January 29, 2013, John Kerry was confirmed by the Senate in a 94–3 vote to be Secretary of State. John Kerry took office on February 1, 2013.

Secretary of the Treasury

The Secretary of the Treasury is reviewed by the Senate Finance Committee.

Tim Geithner (2009–2013)

At the end of November 2008, President-elect Obama announced his intention to nominate Timothy Geithner, President of the New York Federal Reserve Bank, to be United States Secretary of the Treasury, replacing Henry Paulson. Geithner believed, along with Paulson, that the United States Department of the Treasury needed new authority to experiment with responses to the financial crisis of 2007–2008.

In a written statement, Geithner said that China is manipulating the Renminbi by purposefully keeping its value low in order to make its exported products seem cheaper on the world market. If confirmed, Geither said to the Senate Finance Committee that he would ask the Obama administration to pressure China diplomatically to change this practice, more strongly than the Bush administration did. The United States maintains that China's actions hurt American businesses and contributed to the financial crisis of 2007–2008.

At the Senate confirmation hearings, it was revealed through documentary evidence that Geithner had not paid $35,000 self-employment taxes for several years, even though he had acknowledged his obligation to do so, and had filed a request for, and received, a payment for half the taxes owed.  The failure to pay self-employment taxes was noted during a 2006 audit by the Internal Revenue Service, in which Geithner was assessed additional taxes of $14,847 for the 2003 and 2004 tax years.

Geithner failed to pay, or to admit his failure to pay, the self-employment taxes for the 2001 and 2002 tax years until after President-elect Obama expressed his intent to nominate Geithner to be Secretary of Treasury. He also deducted the cost of his children's sleep-away camp as a dependent care expense, when only expenses for day care are eligible for the deduction. Geithner subsequently paid the IRS the additional taxes owed, and was charged interest of $15,000, but was not fined for late payment.  In addition, his housekeeper's work authorization lapsed during the last three months she worked for him.

Geithner's employer at the time, the International Monetary Fund, gives its American employees the employer's half of the payroll taxes, expecting that the employees will deposit the money with the Internal Revenue Service. A report from the Senate Finance Committee documented Geithner's errors. While working for IMF, Geithner signed a tax worksheet stating his "obligation of the U.S. Social Security tax, which I will pay on my fund income" and another annual worksheet stating "I wish to apply for tax allowance of U.S. federal and state income taxes and the difference between the 'self-employed' and 'employed' obligation of the U.S. Social Security tax which I will pay on my Fund income."

In a statement to the Senate panel considering his nomination, Geithner called the tax issues "careless", "avoidable", and "unintentional" errors, and he said he wanted to "apologize to the committee for putting you in the position of having to spend so much time on these issues." Geithner testified that he used TurboTax to prepare his own return and that the tax errors are his own responsibility. The Washington Post quoted a tax expert who said that TurboTax has not been programmed to handle self-employment taxes when the user identifies himself as being employed. Geithner said at the hearing that he was always under the impression that he was an employee, not a self-employed contractor, while he served as director of the Policy Development and Review Department of IMF.

Commentator Michelle Malkin posted on her web site, "IRS employment application packets notify potential workers that the Treasury Inspector General for Tax Administration vets all candidates and current employees 'who have violated or are violating laws, rules, or regulations related to the performance of their duties.' President-elect Obama is standing by a nominee who would oversee the IRS, but might not even qualify for a lesser job at the agency." Former Speaker of the House of Representatives Newt Gingrich, who also opposes his nomination said, "The IRS did not fine him. Ask small businesses how many of them think they could avoid paying self-employment Social Security and Medicare taxes for seven years and not be fined." "Had he not been nominated for Treasury Secretary it's doubtful that he would have ever paid these taxes," Republican Senator Lindsey Graham supported Geithner's nomination, calling him "very, very competent" and "the right guy" for Secretary of the Treasury.

On January 26, 2009, the U.S. Senate confirmed Geithner's appointment by a vote of 60–34. Geithner was sworn in as Treasury Secretary by Vice President Joe Biden and witnessed by President Obama. Geithner left the administration at the end of January 25, 2013.

Jack Lew (2013–2017)

On January 10, 2013, Jacob Lew, then the President's Chief of Staff was nominated as the replacement for retiring Treasury Secretary Geithner, to serve in President Obama's second term. Lew's nomination was confirmed by the full Senate on Wednesday, February 27, 2013, by a vote of 71 to 26. At the White House on the next day (Thursday, February 28), Vice President Joe Biden swore in Lew as the 76th Secretary of the Treasury.

Secretary of Defense
The Secretary of Defense designate is reviewed and presented to the full Senate by the Senate Armed Services Committee.

Robert Gates (2006–2011)

Robert Gates assumed the office of Secretary of Defense on December 18, 2006, under his predecessor then-President George W. Bush. The retention of Gates fulfilled Obama's pledge made on the campaign trail to have a Republican in his Cabinet.

On December 1, 2008, President-elect Obama announced that Robert Gates would remain in his position as Secretary of Defense during his administration, reportedly for at least the first year of Obama's presidency.

Gates is the fourteenth Cabinet member in history to serve under two Presidents of different parties.  One of the first priorities under President Barack Obama's administration for Gates was a review of U.S. policy and strategy in Afghanistan. Gates, sixth in the presidential line of succession, was selected as designated survivor during Obama's inauguration.

Leon Panetta (2011–2013)

On April 18, 2011, Leon Panetta, the Director of the Central Intelligence Agency, was nominated to replace Gates. On June 21, 2011, the United States Senate confirmed Panetta in a 100–0 vote. He took office on June 30, 2011.

Chuck Hagel (2013–2015)

Obama nominated former Senator Chuck Hagel (R-NE) to succeed Leon Panetta and serve as his second term Secretary of Defense on January 7, 2013. U.S. Senate nomination hearings begin on January 31, 2013. On Tuesday, February 26, 2013, after debate in the full Senate had been closed by a vote of 71 to 27, Hagel's nomination was confirmed 58–41 (1 not voting). All the negative votes on each roll call came from Republican Senators, while 18 Republicans voted for cloture of debate and 4 for final confirmation. He took office on February 27, 2013.

On November 24, 2014, The New York Times reported that Hagel would be resigning from his position as Secretary of Defense under pressure from the Obama administration. Later that day, President Obama announced Hagel's resignation and thanked him for his service. Hagel said in a statement, "You should know I did not make this decision lightly. But after much discussion, the President and I agreed that now was the right time for new leadership here at the Pentagon." Hagel stayed on until the confirmation of his successor.

Ash Carter (2015–2017)

On December 5, 2014, President Obama nominated former Deputy Secretary of Defense Ash Carter as his fourth Secretary of Defense. On February 12, 2015, the Senate confirmed Carter in a 93–5 vote.

Attorney General
The confirmation of the office of Attorney General is overseen by the Senate Judiciary Committee.

Eric Holder (2009–2015)

On December 1, 2008, Obama announced that Eric Holder would be his nominee for Attorney General. Holder was formally nominated on January 20, 2009, and approved by the Senate Judiciary Committee on January 28. Following his confirmation by the full Senate by a 75–21 vote on February 2, 2009, he became the first African-American Attorney General of the United States.

In late 2007, Holder joined then-United States Senator Barack Obama's presidential campaign as a senior legal advisor. He served on Obama's vice presidential selection committee.

Holder favors closing the Guantanamo Bay detention camp, although he has said that the detainees are not technically entitled to Geneva convention protections. He is opposed to the Bush administration's implementation of the Patriot Act, saying it is "bad ultimately for law enforcement and will cost us the support of the American people." He has been critical of US torture policy and the NSA warrantless surveillance program, accusing the Bush administration of a "disrespect for the rule of law... [that is] not only wrong, it is destructive in our struggle against terrorism."

During his confirmation hearings in the Senate, Holder agreed with Senator Patrick Leahy, Democrat of Vermont, that a technique used by U.S. interrogators under the Bush administration known as waterboarding is torture.

On September 25, 2014, Holder announced that he would resign his post upon confirmation of a successor.

Loretta Lynch (2015–2017)

On November 8, 2014, President Barack Obama nominated U.S. Attorney Loretta Lynch to succeed Eric Holder as the next Attorney General of the United States. After a contentious nomination process, the Senate confirmed Lynch on April 23, 2015, in a 56–43 vote.

Secretary of the Interior
The nomination of the Secretary of the Interior is presented to the full senate by the Senate Committee on Energy and Natural Resources.

Ken Salazar (2009–2013)

Ken Salazar assumed the office of Secretary of the Interior on January 21, 2009, after a unanimous voice vote on the floor of the full Senate. Colorado Gov. Bill Ritter appointed Denver Superintendent of Schools Michael Bennet to replace Salazar and to finish his term in the Senate, which expired in January 2011. Bennet was elected to a full term in 2010.

Salazar was nominated as Secretary of the Interior on December 19, 2008. His appointment required a Saxbe fix by Congress. On January 7, 2009, Congress approved a bill, ; President Bush signed it into law, providing such a fix by reducing the Secretary of Interior's salary to the level it was prior to the time Salazar took office in January 2009.

The Senate confirmed Salazar's nomination by voice vote on January 20, 2009, shortly after the swearing in of President Obama. As Secretary of the Interior, Salazar is in charge of the National Park Service, the Bureau of Land Management, the United States Fish and Wildlife Service, the United States Geological Survey, and other federal agencies overseen by the Interior Department.

Salazar was one of two Hispanics in the Cabinet, along with Secretary of Labor Hilda Solis of California. (There were three, but on January 4, 2009, Democratic New Mexico Gov. Bill Richardson withdrew his name from the appointment of Secretary of Commerce). Salazar is the second Hispanic Interior Secretary after Manuel Lujan Jr., who held the post from 1989 to 1993 under President George H. W. Bush.

Several prominent environmentalist groups are wary of Salazar, noting his strong ties with the coal and mining industries. Kieran Suckling, executive director of Center for Biological Diversity, which tracks endangered species and habitat issues states "He [Ken Salazar] is a right-of-center Democrat who often favors industry and big agriculture in battles over global warming, fuel efficiency and endangered species."

The nomination was praised, however, by Gene Karpinski, President of the League of Conservation Voters. Upon the nomination, Karpinski said, "Throughout his career, Senator Salazar has campaigned on a pledge of support for 'our land, our water, our people.' With a perfect 100% score on the 2008 LCV Scorecard, he has lived up to that pledge. As a westerner, Senator Salazar has hands on experience with land and water issues, and will restore the Department of the Interior's role as the steward of America's public resources. We look forward to working with him to protect the health of America's land, water, and people in the coming years."

Although Senate Republicans were expected to raise questions concerning Salazar's stances on oil shale development and drilling in environmentally sensitive areas, Salazar was one of several Obama Cabinet appointees confirmed in the Senate by voice vote on January 20, 2009, shortly after Obama's inauguration. Salazar became the 50th Secretary of the Interior succeeding Dirk Kempthorne, who praised Salazar's appointment.

On January 23, 2009, Salazar has stated that he is considering reopening the Statue of Liberty's crown to tourists. The crown has been closed to the public since the September 11 attacks. "I hope we can find a way," Salazar said in a statement. "It would proclaim to the world—both figuratively and literally—that the path to the light of liberty is open to all."

Sally Jewell (2013–2017)

On January 16, 2013, it was reported that Salazar would be leaving his post as Secretary of the Interior in March 2013.
On February 6, 2013, President Obama nominated the CEO of REI, Sally Jewell, as Secretary of the Interior. The Senate confirmed Jewell's nomination by an 87–11 vote on April 10, 2013.

Secretary of Agriculture
The nomination of the Secretary of Agriculture is brought to the full Senate by the Senate Agriculture, Nutrition and Forestry Committee. Tom Vilsack assumed the office of Secretary of Agriculture on January 21, 2009, after a unanimous voice vote of the whole Senate.

Tom Vilsack (2009–2017)

On December 17, 2008, then-President-elect Barack Obama announced his choice of Vilsack as the nominee to be the next Secretary of Agriculture. Vilsack has governed a farm state (Iowa) as did the previous two Secretaries of Agriculture, Senator Mike Johanns (2005–2007) and Ed Schafer (2007–2009). Reaction to Vilsack's nomination from agricultural groups was largely positive and included endorsements from the Corn Refiners Association, the National Grain and Feed Association, the National Farmers Union, the American Farm Bureau Federation, and the Environmental Defense Fund. Opposition to the nomination came those who believed Vilsack has a preference for large industrial farms and genetically modified crops; as Iowa state governor, he originated the seed pre-emption bill in 2005, effectively blocking local communities from regulating where genetically engineered crops would be grown; additionally, Vilsack was the founder and former chair of the Governor's Biotechnology Partnership, and was named Governor of the Year by the Biotechnology Industry Organization, an industry lobbying group. The Senate confirmed Vilsack's nomination for the position by unanimous consent on January 20, 2009.

Secretary of Commerce

The nomination of the Secretary of Commerce is brought to the full Senate by the Commerce, Science and Transportation Committee.

Failed nomination of Bill Richardson (2009)

Bill Richardson was nominated for the position of Secretary of Commerce on December 3, 2008. Nevertheless, due to federal investigation into some of his political donors, he withdrew himself from the nomination on January 4, 2009.

Failed nomination of Judd Gregg (2009)
On February 3, 2009, President Obama nominated New Hampshire Senator Judd Gregg, a Republican. The nomination initially drew criticism, as it would likely give the Democrats in the Senate a super-majority, assuming Al Franken would be seated from Minnesota (as he eventually was) and the two independents regularly voted with the Democrats. Republican Senator Gregg would have been replaced by someone chosen by the state's Governor John Lynch, a Democrat.

Initially, Senator Mitch McConnell announced that he would prevent an attempt to achieve a super majority by the President. After talks, President Obama as well as Senator Gregg assured that it would not be used as an attempt to change the makeup of the Senate.

On February 12, Senator Gregg announced that he had withdrawn from nomination, citing his fundamental disagreement with the Obama administration on "issues such as the stimulus package and the Census."

Gary Locke (2009–2011)
 
Former Washington Governor Gary Locke was designated as the third Commerce nominee, multiple media outlets reported on February 23, 2009. An official announcement was made at a press conference with Locke and President Obama. After confirmation by a voice vote on March 24, Locke became the first Chinese American Secretary of Commerce, and the third Asian American in Obama's cabinet, joining Energy Secretary Steven Chu and Veterans Affairs Secretary Eric Shinseki, the most of any administration in United States history.

John Bryson (2011–2012)

In May 2011, Obama appointed Locke as the new U.S. ambassador to China and nominated John Bryson as the next Secretary of Commerce. Citing Bryson's environmental views, U.S. Sen. James Inhofe (R-Oklahoma) put a hold on his nomination in July. The Senate confirmed Bryson as Secretary of Commerce by a 74–26 vote on October 20, 2011. He was sworn in on October 21, 2011. Bryson took a leave of absence in June 2012 for medical tests due to seizures that were related to a hit and run. On June 21, 2012, Bryson resigned because, "the work that [Commerce employees] do to help America's entrepreneurs and businesses build our economy and create jobs is more important now than ever and I have come to the conclusion that I need to step down to prevent distractions from this critical mission." Deputy Secretary Rebecca Blank served as Acting Secretary of Commerce without Senate confirmation following Bryson's resignation in June 2012 until Penny Pritzker's confirmation in June 2013.

Penny Pritzker (2013–2017)

On May 2, 2013, President Obama announced the nomination of hotel magnate Penny Pritzker as Secretary of Commerce. On June 10, 2013, the Commerce, Science and Technology Committee unanimously approved Pritzker's nomination. On June 25, 2013, Pritzker was confirmed by the full Senate by a vote of 97 to 1.

Secretary of Labor
The Secretary of Labor is confirmed through the Senate Health, Education, Labor, and Pensions Committee.

Hilda Solis (2009–2013)

Hilda Solis assumed office as Secretary of Labor on February 24, 2009, when she was confirmed by the Senate by a vote of 80–17, although her confirmation hearings had been stalled due to Republican concerns over her support of the Employee Free Choice Act and her desire to reverse the Bush Administration's policies to the H-2A Guest Worker Act and tax problems with her husband. On February 11, 2009, Solis's nomination passed the committee phase.

On December 18, 2008, sources close to the Obama transition team identified Solis as the President-elect's choice for U.S. Secretary of Labor, the last cabinet position yet to be filled.

The selection earned praise from the AFL–CIO and other labor organizations, but it brought dismay from business and anti-labor groups. The official announcement was made by Obama on December 19. Her appointment required a Saxbe fix. Due to her confirmation, Solis's successor, Judy Chu was chosen in a special election in California's 32nd congressional district; she declined to endorse any particular replacement candidate.

Solis's confirmation hearings were held on January 9, 2009, before the Senate Health, Education, Labor, and Pensions Committee. Committee chair Ted Kennedy repeatedly praised her, while despite some prodding from Republican members, Solis declined to discuss specific policy issues including the Employee Free Choice Act. Several days later, Senate Republicans said they might try to put a procedural hold on her nomination, out of frustration with her unwillingness to answer questions during the hearings.

Committee Republican Mike Enzi also pressed her on whether her unpaid but high-level positions at American Rights at Work constituted a prohibited lobbying activity; she said she had done no lobbying and was in violation of no rules of conduct. Solis did acknowledge that she had failed to report those positions on her annual House financial disclosure forms at the time, which the White House said was an unintentional oversight. After more time passed with no motion on her nomination, Obama appointed veteran Labor Department official Edward C. Hugler as Acting Secretary.

The prolonged process was seen as foreshadowing continued battles between the Obama administration and Republicans over labor issues. Solis's confirmation process was then set to for a committee vote on February 5, but was postponed again after news that Solis' husband Sam Sayyad had just paid $6,400 in outstanding state and local tax liens for his auto repair business going back to 1993. Sayyad was sole proprietor of the business, filed a separate tax return from Solis, and intended to contest the lien as they were for business taxes he thought he had already paid.

The White House said Solis should not be penalized for any mistakes that her husband may have made. The revelations came in the wake of several other Obama nominations troubled or derailed due to tax issues. Committee Republicans subsequently indicated they would not hold Solis to blame for the taxes situation, but were still concerned about her ties to American Rights at Work. On February 11, 2009, the committee finally supported her nomination by voice vote with two dissensions.

Thomas Perez (2013–2017)
On January 9, 2013, Hilda Solis announced she would not stay on for Obama's second term and that she was resigning. On March 18, 2013, President Obama nominated assistant U.S. Attorney General Thomas Perez for labor secretary.

Republicans opposed the nomination because they saw him as a "committed ideologue". On May 16, 2013, Perez's nomination was endorsed by the committee along party lines. The vote sent the nomination to the Senate floor.

On July 18, 2013, Perez was confirmed as labor secretary after senators reached a deal to avert changing the chamber's rules with his nomination getting 60 votes to break the filibuster. The Senate ultimately confirmed Perez on a party-line vote, 54–46.

Secretary of Health and Human Services

The nomination of the Secretary of Health and Human Services is brought to the full Senate by the Senate Finance Committee, though the nominee also historically meets with the United States Senate Committee on Health, Education, Labor and Pensions.

Failed nomination of Tom Daschle (2009)
Former Senate Majority Leader Tom Daschle was President Obama's first nominee for the Secretary of Health and Human Services. Daschle was paid $220,000 in speaking fees to Healthcare providers, and was paid $16 million as an advisor to Healthcare lobbying groups in the time between his departure from the US Senate and his nomination. Daschle pulled his name from nomination on February 3, 2009.

Kathleen Sebelius (2009–2014)
On March 2, 2009, President Barack Obama introduced Kansas Governor Kathleen Sebelius as his choice to fill the office of Secretary of Health and Human Services. Sebelius was confirmed by the United States Senate on April 28, 2009, on a vote of 65–31 amid the swine flu health crisis.

In April 2013, after the rocky start of HealthCare.gov, the website set up to enroll Americans in insurance exchanges, Sebelius decided to resign as Secretary as according to Sebelius the March 31, 2014, deadline for sign-ups under the health care law provided an opportunity for change so that Obama would be best served by someone who was not the target of so much political ire.

Sylvia Mathews Burwell (2014–2017)
After the resignation of Sebelius was announced, it was revealed that on April 11, 2014, President Obama would nominate Sylvia Mathews Burwell, the director of the Office of Management and Budget, to become Secretary of HHS. On June 5, 2014, Burwell was confirmed by the Senate in a 78–17 vote.

Secretary of Housing and Urban Development
The nomination of the Secretary of Housing and Urban Development is brought to the full Senate by the United States Senate Committee on Banking, Housing and Urban Affairs.

Shaun Donovan (2009–2014)
Shaun Donovan was confirmed as Secretary of Housing and Urban Development by the U.S. Senate on January 27, 2009, by unanimous consent.

In May 2014, the resignation of Secretary Sebelius at HHS, caused a game of musical chairs, with OMB director Burwell being nominated to succeed Sebelius, which in turn on May 23, 2014, lead to the nomination of HUD Secretary Donovan to become the new director of the OMB.

Julian Castro (2014–2017)
After President Obama decided to nominate Secretary Donovan as the new Director of the OMB, on May 23, 2014, Obama nominated the mayor of San Antonio, Julian Castro, to become the new Secretary of Housing and Urban Development. On July 9, 2014, the Senate voted to confirm Castro by a 71–26 vote, with 18 Republicans voting in favor of the nomination.

Secretary of Transportation
The nomination of the Secretary of Transportation is brought to the full Senate by the United States Senate Committee on Commerce, Science and Transportation.

Ray LaHood (2009–2013)
On December 19, 2008, then-President-elect Barack Obama announced that he would nominate former Republican Congressman Ray LaHood to be the next Transportation Secretary. He was confirmed by a voice vote on January 23, 2009.

President Obama said of LaHood "Few understand our infrastructure challenge better than the outstanding public servant that I'm asking to lead the Department of Transportation."

LaHood's nomination was viewed with alarm among those concerned with climate change and suburban sprawl. His resume on transportation matters is seen as thin by many critics. He did not serve on the House Transportation and Infrastructure Committee at the time his selection was announced, although he had in the past. As a member of the House Appropriations Committee he did not work on transportation funding.

While picking LaHood drew praise for its bipartisan symbolism there was also a sense that LaHood's lack of expertise would diminish the department's role in 2009 major policy debates and leave him as more of a ceremonial figure. James Oberstar, the Democratic Congressman who chaired the House Transportation and Infrastructure Committee, was expected to hold more influence and will likely play a stronger leading role. Oberstar praised LaHood's "temperament" and "managerial talent," but when asked to cite an issue LaHood championed during his time on the Transportation Committee in the 1990s, Oberstar seemingly drew a blank. "I can't point to any specific legislation that he authored," he said. "He was a team player all the way through." Oberstar said LaHood would play a supporting role on tough policy calls.

On January 29, 2013, LaHood announced that he would not stay on for Obama's second term and that he would resign upon the confirmation of his successor.

Anthony Foxx (2013–2017)
Anthony Foxx, Mayor of Charlotte, North Carolina was nominated by President Barack Obama on April 29, 2013, to succeed Ray LaHood. On June 10, 2013, the Commerce, Science and Technology Committee unanimously approved Foxx's nomination. On June 27, 2013, Foxx was unanimously (100–0) confirmed by the U.S. Senate. Foxx was sworn in on July 2, as the 17th Secretary of Transportation.

Secretary of Energy
The nomination of the Secretary of Energy is brought to the full US Senate by the Energy and Natural Resources Committee.

Steven Chu (2009–2013)
Nobel Prize–winning scientist Steven Chu was unanimously confirmed by the U.S. Senate on January 20, 2009. On January 21, 2009, Chu was sworn in as Secretary of Energy in the Barack Obama administration. Chu is the first person appointed to the Cabinet after having won a Nobel Prize. He is also the second Chinese American to be a member of the Cabinet after Elaine Chao.

Ernest Moniz (2013–2017)
On February 1, 2013, Secretary Chu announced his resignation pending the confirmation of a successor.

On March 4, 2013, President Obama announced he was nominating Ernest Moniz as Secretary of Energy for his second term. On April 18, 2013, the Senate Energy and Natural Resources Committee voted 21–1 to approve the nomination of Moniz. On May 16, 2013, Moniz was unanimously confirmed by the U.S. Senate.

Secretary of Education

The nomination of the Secretary of Education is brought to the full Senate through the Health, Education, Labor and Pensions Committee. Arne Duncan was confirmed as Secretary of Education on January 21, 2009, by a voice vote.

Arne Duncan (2009–2015)
President Obama nominated Arne Duncan on December 16, 2008, to be his Secretary of Education. In a prepared statement Obama praised Duncan's skills stating "For Arne, school reform isn't just a theory in a book – it's the cause of his life. And the results aren't just about test scores or statistics, but about whether our children are developing the skills they need to compete with any worker in the world for any job."

Duncan received broad bipartisan support during his confirmation hearing in front of the Health, Education, Labor and Pensions Committee on January 13, 2009. Senator Tom Harkin (D-Iowa) said of Duncan, "there is no question that schools across America can benefit from the same kind of fresh thinking that (he) brought to Chicago public schools."

On October 2, 2015, Duncan announced he would be stepping down as Secretary at the close of 2015.

John King Jr. (2016–2017)
Upon the announcement of Duncan's stepping down, President Obama announced his intention to nominate Deputy Secretary of Education John King Jr. as the new Secretary of Education. On March 14, 2016, King was approved to be Secretary of Education by the United States Senate after a 49–40 vote.

Secretary of Veterans Affairs
The nomination of the Secretary of Veterans Affairs is brought to the full Senate by the United States Senate Committee on Veterans Affairs.

Eric Shinseki (2009–2014)
Eric Shinseki was confirmed by the U.S. Senate on a voice vote and assumed the office of Secretary of Veterans Affairs on January 20, 2009. On May 30, 2014, President Obama announced that he had accepted Shinseki's resignation as secretary.

Robert McDonald (2014–2017)
On June 29, 2014, it was reported that U.S. President Barack Obama would nominate former Procter & Gamble executive Robert A. McDonald to succeed General Eric Shinseki as the Secretary of Veterans Affairs. On July 23, 2014, the Senate Committee on Veterans' Affairs backed McDonald 14–0, sending his nomination to the Senate floor. On July 29, 2014, the Senate confirmed McDonald in a 97–0 vote.

Secretary of Homeland Security
The nomination of the Secretary of Homeland Security is brought to the United States Senate Committee on Homeland Security and Governmental Affairs.

Janet Napolitano (2009–2013)
Janet Napolitano was confirmed by the U.S. Senate on a voice vote and assumed the office of Secretary of Homeland Security on January 21, 2009.

On November 5, 2008, Napolitano was named to the advisory board of the Obama-Biden Transition Project. On December 1, 2008, Barack Obama introduced Napolitano as his nominee to head the United States Department of Homeland Security (DHS). On January 20, 2009, Napolitano was confirmed, becoming the first woman appointed Secretary in the relatively new department. Secretary of State Jan Brewer became the governor of Arizona, as the state does not have a lieutenant governor.

On July 12, 2013, Napolitano announced she was resigning to take a position as President of the University of California. Her resignation as Secretary of Homeland Security took effect on September 6, 2013, and Rand Beers served as Acting Secretary from that date until Jeh Johnson's confirmation as Secretary in December. Beers had been then-Acting Deputy Secretary and he retained his Senate-confirmation in the position immediately below, as Under Secretary of Homeland Security for National Protection and Programs; Beers left DHS on March 6, 2014, to join the White House staff.

Jeh Johnson (2013–2017)
On October 17, 2013, President Obama announced his intention to nominate former Pentagon official Jeh Johnson as Secretary of Homeland Security. On December 16, 2013, Johnson was confirmed by the Senate in a 78–16 vote.

Nominated candidates for Cabinet-level positions
President Obama has included members of his cabinet that are not traditionally considered members of the Cabinet.

Chief of Staff

On November 6, 2008, Rahm Emanuel accepted the Cabinet-level position of White House Chief of Staff under Barack Obama. He resigned his congressional seat effective January 2, 2009. A special primary to fill his vacated congressional seat was held on March 3, 2009, and the special general election was held on April 7, 2009. Chicago newspapers reported that one candidate for that seat said at a forum that Emanuel had told him he may be interested in running for the seat again in the future.

Some Republican leaders criticized Rahm Emanuel's appointment because they believed it went against Obama's promises to make politics less divisive, given Emanuel's reputation as a partisan Democrat. Republican Lindsey Graham disagreed, saying: "This is a wise choice by President-elect Obama. He's tough but fair – honest, direct and candid."

Ira Forman, executive director of the National Jewish Democratic Council, said that the choice indicates that Obama will not listen to the wrong people regarding the U.S.–Israel relationship. Some commentators opined that Emanuel would be good for the Israeli–Palestinian peace process because if Israeli leaders make excuses for not dismantling settlements, Emanuel will be tough and pressure the Israelis to comply.

Some Palestinians and Arabs expressed dismay at Obama's appointment of Emanuel. Ali Abunimah of the Electronic Intifada said that Obama's appointment of Emanuel sent the signal he would not be taking "more balanced, more objective, more realistic advice that could change the course from the disastrous Palestine-Israel policies of the Bush and Clinton administrations." Emanuel said that Obama did not need his influence to "orientate his policy toward Israel".

Emanuel left office on October 1, 2010, to be replaced on an interim basis by Pete Rouse, and was elected Mayor of Chicago the following February. William M. Daley became White House Chief of Staff on January 13, 2011, when interim Chief Pete Rouse was made legal Counselor to the President. A year later, on January 9, 2012, Daley announced his intention to retire in favor of Jack Lew (Budget Director since November 2010). Lew took office on January 27, 2012, but he, too, left the job a year later (on January 25, 2013) when he was nominated to be Secretary of the Treasury (see above).

From January 25, 2013, until January 20, 2017, the Chief of Staff was Denis McDonough, formerly the Deputy National Security Advisor.

Director of the Office of the Budget

Peter Orszag (2009–2010)
On November 25, 2008, President-elect Barack Obama announced that Peter R. Orszag would be his nominee for director of the Office of Management and Budget, the arm of the White House responsible for crafting the federal budget and overseeing the effectiveness of federal programs. At 40, he was the youngest member of the Obama Cabinet, as the president upgraded the Director of OMB to cabinet-level priority.

Jack Lew (2010–2012)
Orszag resigned, effective from July 30, 2010. On July 13, 2010, the White House announced that Jack Lew had been chosen to replace Orszag as Director of OMB, subject to Senate confirmation. During confirmation hearings in the Senate, in response to questioning by Senator Bernie Sanders (I-VT), Lew said that he did not believe deregulation was a "proximate cause" of the financial crisis of 2007–2008: Lew told the panel that "the problems in the financial industry preceded deregulation," and after discussing those issues, added that he didn't "personally know the extent to which deregulation drove it, but I don't believe that deregulation was the proximate cause." On November 18, 2010, Lew was confirmed by the Senate by unanimous consent. Jack Lew served from November 18, 2010 – January 27, 2012, when he resigned to become Obama's White House Chief of Staff. Following Lew's resignation, Jeffrey Zients served as Acting OMB Director until Sylvia Mathews Burwell's confirmation 15 months later.

Sylvia Mathews Burwell (2013–2014)
On March 3, 2013, it was announced that President Obama nominated Sylvia Mathews Burwell to head the OMB. On April 24, 2013, the U.S. Senate confirmed Burwell 96–0.

Shaun Donovan (2014–2017)
In May 2014, the resignation of Secretary Sebelius at HHS, caused a game of musical chairs, with OMB director Burwell being nominated to succeed Sebelius, which in turn on May 23, 2014, lead to the nomination of HUD Secretary Donovan to become the new director of the OMB. On July 10, 2014, Donovan was confirmed as Director of the OMB in a 75–22 vote.

Ambassador to the United Nations

Susan Rice (2009–2013)
On November 5, 2008, Susan Rice was named to the advisory board of the Obama-Biden Transition Project. On December 1, 2008, she was nominated by President-elect Obama to be the U.S. Ambassador to the United Nations, a position which he also upgraded to cabinet level. Rice is the second youngest and the first African American woman US Representative to the UN.
Dr. Rice announced that she would have both a transition team in place in New York and in Washington, DC at the State Department to be headed by Hillary Clinton. Rice was confirmed by the Senate by voice vote on January 22, 2009.

Samantha Power (2013–2017)
On June 5, 2013, President Obama announced that he would appoint Susan Rice as National Security Advisor in succession to Tom Donilon. Rice in turn would be replaced as Ambassador to the United Nations by Samantha Power. On July 23, 2013, the Senate Foreign Relations Committee approved Power's nomination. On August 1, 2013, the Senate confirmed Power in an 87–10 vote.

Administrator of the Environmental Protection Agency

Lisa P. Jackson (2009–2013)
On December 15, 2008, President-Elect Barack Obama officially designated Lisa P. Jackson as the nominee for Administrator of the Environmental Protection Agency. She was confirmed through unanimous consent of the U.S. Senate on January 23, 2009. Jackson is the first African American to serve as EPA Administrator, along with being the fourth woman and second New Jerseyan to hold the position.

Gina McCarthy (2013–2017)
Lisa Jackson decided not to stay for Obama's second term. On March 4, 2013, President Obama announced he was nominating Gina McCarthy as EPA Administrator for his second term.

On May 9, 2013, all eight Republicans on the Senate Environment and Public Works Committee boycotted the panel in order to deny a vote on Gina McCarthy's nomination to head the EPA. On May 16, 2013, McCarthy's nomination was endorsed by the committee along party lines. The vote sends McCarthy's nomination to the Senate floor. However, Sen. Roy Blunt (R-Mo.) placed a hold on her nomination which had to be withdrawn before a floor vote occurred.

On July 18, 2013, McCarthy was confirmed as EPA administrator after senators reached a deal to avert changing the chamber's rules and which saw the Senate vote to move forward with a vote on McCarthy, with her nomination getting 69 votes to break the filibuster. The Senate ultimately confirmed McCarthy on a 59–40 vote.

Trade Representative

Ron Kirk (2009–2013)
Although there was speculation that Ron Kirk would be appointed Secretary of Transportation by President Obama, he was given the position of Trade Representative. As a supporter of the North American Free Trade Agreement, his selection has drawn concern from advocates of fair trade policies.

On January 22, 2013, Kirk announced that he would be stepping down as U.S. Trade Rep. His resignation became effective March 15, 2013.

Michael Froman (2013–2017)
On May 2, 2013, President Obama announced the nomination of deputy national security adviser for international economics Michael Froman as Trade Representative. On June 11, 2013, the Senate Finance Committee approved Froman's nomination. On June 19, 2013, Froman was confirmed by the U.S. Senate in a 93 to 4 vote.

Chair of the Council of Economic Advisers

Christina Romer (2009–2010)
On November 24, 2008, President Barack Obama designated Christina Romer as Chair of the Council of Economic Advisers upon the start of his administration.

After her nomination and before the Obama administration took office, Romer was tasked with co-authoring the administration's plan to recover from the 2008 recession. With economist Jared Bernstein, Romer co-authored Obama's plan for economic recovery.

In a video presentation, she discussed details of the job-creation package that the Obama administration submitted to Congress.

Austan Goolsbee (2010–2011)
Romer resigned in September 2010 to return to positions in academia.

Austan Goolsbee was designated chair of the Council on September 10, 2010, succeeding Christina Romer.

On June 6, 2011, Goolsbee announced that he would return to the University of Chicago, claiming that the economy was "a million miles from where it started". He was expected to play an informal role from Chicago in Obama's 2012 campaign. Goolsbee's resignation became effective August 5, 2011.

Alan Krueger (2011–2013)
On August 29, 2011, Alan Krueger was nominated by Obama to be chairman of the White House Council of Economic Advisers, and on November 3, 2011, the Senate unanimously confirmed his nomination.

Jason Furman (2013–2017)
As Krueger had to return to Princeton University in the fall of 2013 or face the prospect of losing tenure, he chose to resign as chair.
 On June 10, 2013, Jason Furman was named by President Barack Obama as Chairman of the Council of Economic Advisors (CEA). On August 1, 2013, the Senate confirmed Furman.

Administrator of the Small Business Administration

Karen Mills (2009–2013)
Karen Mills was nominated by President-elect Barack Obama on December 19, 2008, confirmed unanimously by the Senate on April 2, 2009, and sworn in on April 6, 2009. During her tenure, in 2012 her office was elevated to the rank of Cabinet-level officer, expanding her power on policy decisions and granting her access to cabinet meetings.

On February 11, 2013, Mills announced her resignation as Administrator of the SBA.

Maria Contreras-Sweet (2014–2017)
On January 15, 2014, Maria Contreras-Sweet was nominated by President Barack Obama to join his Cabinet as head of the Small Business Administration. Contreras-Sweet was confirmed as the Administrator of the Small Business Administration by voice vote on March 27, 2014. She assumed role of her position as Administrator of the Small Business Administration on April 7, 2014.

Formerly Cabinet-level

Director of the Office of National Drug Control Policy
On February 11, 2009, it was reported that Gil Kerlikowske had accepted an offer by President Obama to become Director of the Office of National Drug Control Policy, succeeding John P. Walters. On May 7, 2009, the Senate confirmed Kerlikowske's nomination by a vote of 91–1. However, prior to Kerlikowske's nomination, the position was downgraded from a Cabinet-level position to a non-Cabinet-level position.

See also
First inauguration of Barack Obama
Second inauguration of Barack Obama
Presidential transition of Barack Obama

Notes

References

External links
List of Cabinet and Cabinet Level Officers at Obama White House archived website (As of January 20, 2017)

 
Cabinet of United States Presidents
Cabinets established in 2009
Cabinets disestablished in 2017
Cabinet